The 2017 Swiss Indoor Athletics Championships was the 36th edition of the national championship in indoor track and field for Switzerland. It was held on 18–19 February at the Sporthalle End der Welt in Magglingen, Evilard. A total of 24 events (divided evenly between the sexes) were contested over the two-day competition.

Results

Men

Women

References

 Schweizer Hallen Leichtathletik Meisterschaften Aktive – Rangliste . Swiss Athletics. Retrieved 2019-07-14.

Swiss Indoor Athletics Championships
Swiss Indoor Athletics Championships
Swiss Indoor Athletics Championships
Swiss Indoor Athletics Championships
Sport in the Canton of Bern